The perpetual virginity of Mary is a Christian doctrine that Mary, the mother of Jesus, was a virgin "before, during and after" the birth of Christ. In Western Christianity, the Catholic Church adheres to the doctrine, as do some Lutherans, Anglicans, Reformed, and other Protestants. Shenouda III, Pope of the Coptic Orthodox Church, affirmed the teaching, and Eastern Orthodox churches recognize Mary as Aeiparthenos, meaning "ever-virgin". It is one of the four Marian dogmas of the Catholic Church. Most modern nonconformist Protestants reject the doctrine.

The tradition of the perpetual virginity of Mary first appears in a late 2nd-century text called the Protoevangelium of James. The Second Council of Constantinople in 553 gave her the title "Aeiparthenos", meaning Perpetual Virgin, and at the Lateran Synod of 649 Pope Martin I emphasized the threefold character of the perpetual virginity, before, during, and after the birth of Christ. The Lutheran Smalcald Articles (1537) and the Reformed Second Helvetic Confession (1562) codified the doctrine of perpetual virginity of Mary as well.

The doctrine of Mary's perpetual virginity has been challenged on the basis that the New Testament explicitly affirms her virginity only until the birth of Jesus and mentions the brothers (adelphoi) of Jesus. This word only very rarely means other than a biological or spiritual sibling, and they may have been: (1) the sons of Mary, the mother of Jesus, and Joseph; (2) sons of the Mary named in Mark 15:40 as "mother of James and Joses", whom Jerome identified as a sister of Mary, the mother of Jesus; or (3) sons of Joseph by a former marriage. Further scriptural difficulties were added by Luke 2:7, which calls Jesus the "first-born" son of Mary, and Matthew 1:25, which adds that Joseph "did not know her until she had brought forth her firstborn son."

Origin and history

Virginitas in partu: 1st century 
The Odes of Solomon have been interpreted as implying that Mary was a virgin even during childbirth as well as stating that Mary did not have pain during childbirth. However some have theorized that the Odist was referring to the story of the Exodus, where Jewish women had very quick childbirth, having been said to even have happened almost instantly, which is why the Egyptian midwives could not come fast enough. Similar statements exist in the Ascension of Isaiah.

Some have argued that Josephus in the first century believed James to be a biological brother of Jesus.

First appearance: 2nd century 
 
The virgin birth of Jesus is found in the Gospel of Matthew and possibly in Luke, but it seems to have little theological importance before the middle of the 2nd century. The 2nd century Church fathers Irenaeus and Justin Martyr, though mentioning the virgin birth, nowhere affirmed the view that Mary was a perpetual virgin.
The idea is first raised in an apocryphal text called the Protoevangelium of James, composed in the second half of the 2nd century: here Mary remains a life-long virgin, Joseph is an old man who marries her without physical desire, and the brothers of Jesus mentioned in the canonical gospels are explained as Joseph's sons by an earlier marriage. The Protoevangelium seems to have been used to create the stories of Mary which are found in the Quran, but while Muslims agree with Christians that Mary was a virgin at the moment of the conception of Jesus, the idea of her perpetual virginity thereafter is contrary to the Islamic ideal of women as wives and mothers.

The Ebionites denied Mary's perpetual virginity and Hegesippus possibly disputed the perpetual virginity of Mary.

Early uncertainty: 3rd century 

In the 3rd century, Hippolytus of Rome held that Mary was "ever-virgin", while Clement of Alexandria, writing soon after the Protoevangelium appeared, appealed to its incident of a midwife who examined Mary immediately after the birth ("after giving birth, she was examined by a midwife, who found her to be a virgin") and asserted that this was to be found in the Gospels ("These things are attested to by the Scriptures of the Lord"), though he was referring to an apocryphal Gospel as a fact. The 3rd century scholar Origen used the Protoevangelium's explanation of the brothers to uphold the perpetual virginity of Mary ("There is no child of Mary except Jesus, according to those who think correctly about her"). Origen also mentioned that the gospel of Peter affirmed the perpetual virginity of Mary, saying that the "brothers" of Jesus were from a previous marriage of Joseph.

Tertullian, who came between Clement and Origen, denied Mary's virginity in partu to refute the docetist idea that the Son of God could not have assumed a human body ("although she was a virgin when she conceived, she was a wife when she brought forth her son").

Helvidius also argued that Victorinus believed that Mary had other children; Jerome later claimed that Helvidius was misinterpreting Victorinus. Epiphanus invented a name "Antidicomarians" for a group of people who denied the perpetual virginity of Mary, which Epiphanus attacked. Their same views were also mentioned earlier by Origen, although he too rejected them as heretical. They were active from the 3rd to the 5th century.

According to Epiphanius the Antidicomarians claimed that Apollinaris of Laodicea or his disciples denied the perpetual virginity of Mary, though Epiphanus doubted the claim.

Early Christian theologians such as Hippolytus (170–235), Eusebius (260/265–339/340) and Epiphanius (c. 310/320–403) defended the perpetual virginity of Mary.

Establishment of orthodoxy: 4th century 
By the early 4th century the spread of monasticism had promoted celibacy as the ideal state, and a moral hierarchy was established with marriage occupying the third rank below life-long virginity and widowhood Eastern theologians generally accepted Mary as Aeiparthenos, but many in the Western church were less convinced. The theologian Helvidius objected to the devaluation of marriage inherent in this view and argued that the two states, of virginity and marriage, were equal. His contemporary Jerome, realising that this would lead to the Mother of God occupying a lower place in heaven than virgins and widows, defended her perpetual virginity in his immensely influential Against Helvidius, issued c.383.

In the 380s and 390s the monk Jovinian denied Mary's virginity in partu (virgin during childbirth), writing that if Jesus did not undergo a normal human birth, then his body was something other than a truly human one. As reported by Augustine, Jovinian "denied that the virginity of Mary, which existed when she conceived, remained while she gave birth." Augustine goes on to say that the reason for Jovinian's denial of Mary's virginity in partu was that the doctrine was too close to the Manichean view that Christ was simply a phantom. According to Ambrose, Jovinian maintained that Mary had conceived as a virgin, but she had not given birth as a virgin. Jerome wrote against Jovinian but failed to mention this aspect of his teaching, and most commentators believe that he did not find it offensive. Jovinian also found two monks in Milan, Sarmatio and Barbatian, who held similar views as Jovinian.

The only important Christian intellectual to defend Mary's virginity in partu was Ambrose, Archbishop of Milan, who was the chief target of the charge of Manicheism. For Ambrose, both the physical birth of Jesus by Mary and the baptismal birthing of Christians by the church had to be totally virginal, even in partu, in order to cancel the stain of original sin, of which the pains of labor are the physical sign. It was due to Ambrose that virginitas in partu came to be included consistently in the thinking of subsequent theologians. Bonosus of Sardica also denied the perpetual virginity of Mary, for which he was declared a heretic. His followers would survive for many centuries, especially among the Goths. Additionally the perpetual virginity of Mary was denied by some Arians.

Jovinian was condemned as a heretic at a Synod of Milan under Ambrose's presidency in 390 and Mary's perpetual virginity was established as the only orthodox view. Further developments were to follow when the Second Council of Constantinople in 553 formally gave her the title "Aeiparthenos", and at the Lateran Synod of 649 Pope Martin I emphasised the threefold character of the perpetual virginity, before, during, and after the birth of Christ.

Athanasius of Alexandria (d.393) declared Mary Aeiparthenos, "ever-virgin", and the liturgy of James the brother of Jesus likewise required a declaration of Mary as ever-virgin. The view was also defended by Augustine, Hilary of Potiers, Didymus the Blind, Cyril of Alexandria among others.

The Apostles' Creed taught the doctrine of virginitas in partu.

Middle Ages 
In the Middle Ages the perpetual virginity of Mary was commonly accepted, however the Paulicians denied her perpetual virginity, even saying that Christ denied her to be blessed.

Protestant Reformation 
The Protestant Reformation saw a rejection of the special moral status of lifelong celibacy. As a result, marriage and parenthood were extolled, and Mary and Joseph were seen as a normal married couple. It also affirmed the Bible alone as the fundamental source of authority regarding God's word (sola scriptura). The reformers noted that while scripture records the virgin birth, it makes no mention of Mary's perpetual virginity following the birth of Christ. Mary's perpetual virginity was upheld by Martin Luther (who names her ever-virgin in the Smalcald Articles, a Lutheran confession of faith written in 1537), Huldrych Zwingli, Thomas Cranmer, Wollebius, Bullinger, John Wycliffe and later Protestant leaders including John Wesley, the co-founder of Methodism. Osiander denied the perpetual virginity of Mary, for which Melanchthon was scornful.

John Calvin's view was more ambiguous, believing that knowing what happened to Mary after the birth of Jesus is impossible. However John Calvin argued that Matthew 1:25, used by Helvidius to attack the perpetual virginity of Mary does not teach that Mary had other children. Other Calvinists affirmed Mary's perpetual virginity, including within the Second Helvetic Confession—stating that Mary was the "ever virgin Mary"—and in the notes of the Geneva Bible. Theodore Beza, a prominent early Calvinist, included the perpetual virginity of Mary in a list of agreements between Calvinism and the Catholic Church. Some reformers upheld the doctrine to counter more radical reformers who questioned the divinity of Christ; Mary's perpetual virginity guaranteed the Incarnation of Christ despite the challenges to its scriptural foundations. Modern Protestants have largely rejected the perpetual virginity of Mary on the basis of sola scriptura, and it has rarely appeared explicitly in confessions or doctrinal statements, though the perpetual virginity of Mary is still a common belief in Anglicanism and Lutheranism.

Among the Anabaptists, Hubmaier never abandoned his belief in the perpetual virginity of Mary and continued to esteem Mary as theotokos ("mother of God"). These two doctrinal stances are addressed individually in Articles Nine and Ten, respectively, of Hubmaier's work, Apologia.

Doctrine

The Second Council of Constantinople recognized Mary as Aeiparthenos, meaning "ever-virgin". It remains axiomatic for the Eastern Orthodox Church that she remained virginal throughout her Earthly life, and Orthodoxy therefore understands the New Testament references to the brothers and sisters of Jesus as signifying his kin, but not the biological children of his mother.

The Latin Church, known more commonly today as the Catholic Church, shared the Council of Constantinople with the theologians of the Greek or Orthodox communion, and therefore shares with them the title Aeiparthenos as accorded to Mary. The Catholic Church has gone further than the Orthodox in making the Perpetual Virginity one of the four Marian dogmas, meaning that it is held to be a truth divinely revealed, the denial of which is heresy. It declares her virginity before, during and after the birth of Jesus, or in the definition formulated by Pope Martin I at the Lateran Council of 649:The blessed ever-virginal and immaculate Mary conceived, without seed, by the Holy Spirit, and without loss of integrity brought him forth, and after his birth preserved her virginity inviolate.

Thomas Aquinas admitted that reason could not prove this, but argued that it must be accepted because it was "fitting", for as Jesus was the only-begotten son of God, so he should also be the only-begotten son of Mary, as a second and purely human conception would disrespect the sacred state of her holy womb. Symbolically, the perpetual virginity of Mary signifies a new creation and a fresh start in salvation history. It has been stated and argued repeatedly, most recently by the Second Vatican Council:
This union of the mother with the Son in the work of salvation is made manifest from the time of Christ's virginal conception … then also at the birth of Our Lord, who did not diminish his mother's virginal integrity but sanctified it... (Lumen Gentium, No.57)

Arguments and evidence 

A problem facing theologians wishing to maintain Mary's life-long virginity is that the Pauline epistles, the four gospels, and the Acts of the Apostles, all mention the brothers (adelphoi) of Jesus, with Mark and Matthew recording their names and Mark adding unnamed sisters. The Gospel of James, followed a century later by Epiphanius, explained the adelphoi as Joseph's children by an earlier marriage, which is still the view of the Eastern Orthodox Christian churches. Jerome, believing that Joseph, like Mary, must be a life-long virgin, argued that these adelphoi were the sons of "Mary, the mother of James and Joses" (Mark 15:40), who he identified with the wife of Clopas and sister of the virgin Mary (John 19:25), which remains popular in the Western church. A modern proposal considers these adelphoi sons of "Mary, the mother of James and Joses" (not here identified with the Virgin Mary's sister), and Clopas, who according to Hegesippus was Joseph's brother.

Further scriptural difficulties were added by Luke 2:7, which calls Jesus the "first-born" son of Mary, and Matthew 1:25, which adds that Joseph "did not know her until she had brought forth her firstborn son." Helvidius argued that first-born implies later births, and that the word "until" left open the way to sexual relations after the birth; Jerome, replying that even an only son will be a first-born and that "until" did not have the meaning Helvidius construed for it, painted a repulsive word-portrait of Joseph having intercourse with a blood-stained and exhausted Mary immediately after she has given birth—the implication, in his view, of Helvidius's arguments. Opinions on the quality of Jerome's rebuttal range from the view that it was masterful and well-argued to thin, rhetorical and sometimes tasteless.

Two other 4th century Fathers, Gregory of Nyssa, following "a certain apocryphal account", and Augustine, advanced a further argument by reading  as a vow of perpetual virginity on Mary's part; this idea, first introduced in the Protoevangelium of James, has little scholarly support today, but it and the arguments advanced by Jerome and Ambrose were put forward by Pope John Paul II in his catechesis of August 28, 1996, as the four facts supporting the Catholic Church's ongoing faith in Mary's perpetual virginity.

It has been argued from John 19, where Jesus entrusts Mary to the disciple John instead of his brothers, to support the view that Jesus had no brothers, however Protestants have generally argued in two ways against this passage, one by claiming that the brothers of Jesus were unbelievers or that they weren't present during the crucifixion.

Some have argued that Mary and Joseph couldn't have had a normal marriage if Mary remained a perpetual virgin, however it has been argued by some Catholics that there is evidence that celibacy within marriage was already practiced by the Qumran community and other Jews at that time.

See also 
 Anglican Marian theology
 Antidicomarians
 Assumption of Mary
 Catholic Mariology
 Immaculate Conception
 Lutheran Mariology
 New Eve
 Panachranta (icon)
 Virgin birth of Jesus

Notes

References

Citations

Bibliography

 

 

 

Anglican theology and doctrine
Assyrian Church of the East
Catholic theology and doctrine
Christian terminology
Eastern Orthodox Mariology
Eastern Orthodox theology
Lutheran theology
Marian dogmas
Methodism
Non-sexuality
Sexuality in Christianity
Virginity